Andrés Alberto Mota Matos (born March 4, 1966) is a former Major League Baseball player and current player agent.

Early life 

Mota was born in Santo Domingo, Dominican Republic and is the son of former major league player Manny Mota, as well as the brother of José Mota and cousin of José Báez.

Mota attended Golden West College. He then attended California State University, Fullerton.

Baseball career 

He was initially drafted in the sixth round of the 1985 amateur draft by the Kansas City Royals, but did not sign.  In 1987 he was drafted by the Houston Astros in the twelfth round.  Mota amassed just 90 at-bats in 27 games at second base for the Astros in 1991, batting .189.

Mota continued playing in the minor leagues through the end of the 1994 season.

After baseball 

Today, Mota is a baseball player agent.  He is a senior vice president of baseball at Wasserman. He lives in south Florida. Mota is happily married to a well known and talented entrepreneur from California and they have a beautiful baby boy.

See also
List of second-generation Major League Baseball players

References

External links

1966 births
Cal State Fullerton Titans baseball players
Dominican Republic expatriate baseball players in the United States
Golden West Rustlers baseball players
Houston Astros players

Living people
Major League Baseball players from the Dominican Republic
Major League Baseball infielders